Neway Group Holdings Limited  is a Hong Kong-listed entertainment and printing company. In 1983, Chung Tai Printing expanded into production of labels and overlays using material supplied by 3M Hong Kong Ltd. The labels and overlays business was later operated under the name of King's Industrial Co. and became one of the few authorized converters in Hong Kong for the manufacture of 3M labels, adhesive labels and overlays. 
As business grown, The Greatime Offset Printing Co., Ltd was established in 1987 to conduct the offset printing business and to serve the growing market of brochures, manuals, booklets and other paper products. To lower cost, Chung Tai Printing (China) Co., Ltd was established in Shenzhen to take advantage of the competitive production costs.

Chung Tai Printing went into public listing on the Hong Kong Stock Exchange in 1992.

To further expand and diversify its business, it acquired Neway Entertainment Group in 2009  and changed the Group's name to Neway Group Holdings Limited.

Key Operations
Neway Group operations can be divided into Printing, Music and Entertainment. Printing consists of the Chung Tai printing business which was the foundation of Neway Group when it was setup.  The entertainment stream covers the karaoke and music businesses bought through Neway Entertainment group back in 2009.

Printing Operations
Printing line of business is operated under the name of Chung Tai Printing in both Hong Kong and China.  The core production plant is located in Shenzhen, one of China's economic zones, and employs about 1,500 workers. It covers about 1 million square feet and is equipped with various facilities. Key subsidiaries include the following :

Chung Tai Printing (China) Company Limited
Chung Tai Printing Company Limited
The Greatime Offset Printing Company Limited
Chung Tai Advertising Company
Chung Tai Credit Card Mfg., Co.
Delight Source Limited
Kam Hon Printing (Shenzhen) Co., Ltd.

Music and Entertainment
The music and entertainment line of business manages the careers of singers and pop groups, produces and issues recorded music, and produces motion pictures. The operations are delivered through the following subsidiaries:

Neway Star Limited
Star Entertainment (Universe) Limited
Neway Star Pictures Limited

Latest Development
Neway Group Holdings Ltd was selling its entire stake and debt of Zen Vantage Ltd to Ritzy Success Enterprises Limited for HK$153 Million.

References

External links
Official website
Will Neway Group Holdings Limited (HKG:55) Continue To Underperform Its Industry?. by Lester Strauss. 2018-04-24
HK Trade Development Council 
Chung Tai Printing, Bloomberg Company Profile

Companies listed on the Hong Kong Stock Exchange
Hong Kong brands